WISH  is a collection of Janice Vidal's top hits, with four new singles: 'Wish', '心有不甘', '殘酷遊戲', and '你的眼神'. Of the four new songs released, the lyrics of '心有不甘' were rewritten from the original song '梦醒时分', and '你的眼神' was also changed into a Cantonese version of the song '你的眼神' by Tsai Chin. The album also comes with a total of 17 music videos of Janice's new songs and some of her classic hits.

Track listing 
Disc 1
	Wish	
	心有不甘	
	深愛	
	夏日傾情	
	一場誤會	
	愛才	
	愛你還愛你	
	今夜你不會來	
	越幫越忙	
	My Cookie Can	
	口花花	
	無所謂	
	主角愛我	
	我愛呼吸	
	霎眼嬌	
	拍錯拖
	
Disc 2
	殘酷遊戲	
	你的眼神	
	離家出走	
	大哥	
	心亂如麻	
	就算世畀無童話	
	My Love My Fate	
	情深說話	
	陰天假期	
	雜技	
	愛深過做人	
	寒命	
	你知道我在等你仰分手嗎	
	如水	
	十個他不如你一個	
	不可一世	
Disc 3
	Wish [MV] (DVD)	　
	Rainbows [MV] (DVD)	　
	Please [MV] (DVD)	　
	Pretty [MV] (DVD)	　
	離家出走 [MV] (DVD)	　
	心亂如麻 [MV] (DVD)	　
	愛才 [MV] (DVD)	　
	愛你還愛你 [MV] (DVD)	　
	越幫越忙 [MV] (DVD)	　
	My Love My Fate [MV] (DVD)	　
	十個他不如你一個 [MV] (DVD)	　
	一場誤會 [MV] (DVD)	　
	今夜你不會來 [MV] (DVD)	　
	無所謂 [MV] (DVD)	　
	大哥 [MV] (DVD)	　
	雜技 [MV] (DVD)	　
	24 [MV] (DVD)

External links 
 A music
 [ All-Music Guide]

2009 albums
Janice Vidal albums